The Eastern Indiana Athletic Conference (EIAC) is a distinguished, eight-member IHSAA-sanctioned high school athletic conference. Current members consist of Batesville, Connersville, East Central, Franklin County, Greensburg, Lawrenceburg, Rushville, and South Dearborn. All eight member schools are located in rural southeast Indiana, spread across Dearborn, Decatur, Fayette, Franklin, Ripley, and Rush counties. The EIAC was founded in 1956 when Brookville, Cambridge City, and Hagerstown of the East Central Conference joined with Aurora, Batesville, and Lawrenceburg of the Southeastern Indiana Conference. Batesville and Lawrenceburg are the only two of the original six founding schools that haven't consolidated or left the conference. North Dearborn joined the conference in 1962, which eventually consolidated into East Central in 1973. In 1974, Greensburg parted ways with the South Central Conference to join the EIAC. Aurora consolidated into South Dearborn in 1978 and Brookville consolidated into Franklin County in 1989. With the exception of 1962-66, 1973-74, 1977-85 (7 members), and 1974-77 (8 members), the conference had been a six-member league until 2013 when Connersville and Rushville joined.

This conference should not be confused with the Eastern Indiana Conference, a small-school conference in Northeast Indiana that existed from 1953 to 1975.

Membership

Football Divisions
In football, two divisions were implemented starting in 2013.

Former Members

 Was North Vernon before 1968, played concurrently in EIAC and HHC 1972-73.
 Colors were light blue  and white  until 1968.

Conference Championships

Football

Boys Basketball 

 Champions 1963–66, 1969-70, 1973–74, 1975-76, and 1980-88 (except SD 1984-85) unverified.

Girls Basketball 

 Champions between beginning of competition in sport until 1991, and 1992-95 are unverified.

State Champions

Batesville Bulldogs (6)
 1992 Mike Daily, Wrestling (Wt. 119)
 2007 Ellie Tidman, Track & Field (High Jump)
 2008 Ellie Tidman, Track & Field (High Jump)
 2009 Ellie Tidman, Track & Field (High Jump)
 2010 Ellie Tidman, Track & Field (High Jump)
 2011 Chris Giesting, Track & Field (400 Meter Dash)
 2001 Boys Basketball Runner-Up (2A)
 2002 Baseball Runner-Up (2A)

East Central Trojans (3)
 1994 Football (4A)
 2017 Football (4A)
 2022 Football (4A)
 1993 Football Runner-Up (4A)
 2015 Football Runner-Up (4A)

Greensburg Pirates (2)
 2013 Boys Basketball (3A)
 2014 Boys Basketball (3A)
 2018 Girls Basketball Runner up (3A)

Lawrenceburg Tigers (7)
 1963 Denver Kennett, Track & Field (High Jump)
 1975 Football (A)
 1976 Football Finalist (A)
 1978 Football (A)
 1985 Football Finalist (A)
 1986 Chris Green, Track & Field (400 Meter Dash)
 2016 Football Finalist (AAA)
 2016-2017-2018 - Mason Parris, Wrestling (220 Pounds)

Resources 
 IHSAA Conferences
 IHSAA Directory
 IHSAA State Champions
 IHSAA Classification
 IHSAA Football Classification

References

Indiana high school athletic conferences
High school sports conferences and leagues in the United States